Numbers of Sri Lankan internally displaced persons displaced from the Vanni region since October 2008 and detained by the Sri Lankan Military at various camps in northern and eastern Sri Lanka during October 2009 to January 2010:

References

Refugee camps in Sri Lanka
Demographics of Sri Lanka
2009 in Sri Lanka